Jean Bonaventure Thierry du Mont, 1st Count of Gages (Mons, now in Belgium, 27 December 1682 – Pamplona, Spain, 31 January 1753), Viceroy of Navarre, 1746–1753, a Knight of the Order of the Golden Fleece in 1745,  was a Walloon born Spanish General who was awarded by King Philip V of Spain in 1745 the title of "Conde", "Count", of Gages, a village near Brugelette in Hainaut.

Life 

A lieutenant in the Walloon Guards, du Mont fought for the Spanish in many battles during the War of Spanish Succession, distinguishing himself in the Battle of Villaviciosa, and he also took part in the Spanish expedition to Oran (1732).

du Mont is best known for his role in the War of the Austrian Succession (1740–1748), a.k.a. King George's War in North America, and incorporating the War of Jenkins' Ear between Great-Britain and Spain.

The war in Italy was fought between a French-Spanish coalition, commanded by Infante Felipe, son of king Philip V of Spain, assisted between others by the French Marshal Maillebois, and du Mont as Captain General of the Spanish and Neapolitan armies on the one hand, and an Austrian-Sardinian coalition, backed by Great-Britain on the other hand.

During the War of Polish Succession (1733-1738), Spain had retrieved Naples and Sicily, but failed to retake Milan and Parma. Now King Philip V, but mostly his second wife, energetic and ambitious former Italian Princess Elizabeth of Parma, wanted to retake all former Spanish territories in Italy for her son King Charles VII of Naples and Sicily.  	 	
 
On 8 February 1743 du Mont defeated the Austrians and Sardinians at the Battle of Campo Santo, followed later from September to December 1745 by the 2nd Battle of Milan, 1745 which was widely considered a victory in Madrid.

When Marshal Saxe defeated the British Army at Battle of Fontenoy in 1745 and overran the Low Countries, the Spanish Crown granted du Mont the county of Gages, near his birthplace until then occupied by the Austrians since 1713.

Meanwhile, "Juan de Gages" as he was usually called by his Spanish-Neapolitan soldiers, fought against the Austrians in the Milanese and Piedmont, Parma and Piacenza supported by the Genoese. Towards the end of 1745 Alexandria and Milan were also conquered, but then the chances of war turned.

The Austrians took back Milan on 18 March 1746 and the Spanish-Neapolitan army under the count of Gages was beaten by the Austrians at the Battle of Piacenza (16 June 1746), and the Battle of Tidone (10 August 1746). Enough was enough, moneywise and blood wise. The new King of Spain, Ferdinand VI of Spain, the half brother of King Charles of Naples and Sicily (later also King of Spain under the name Charles III of Spain), was probably well advised to stop all these adventurous and costly wars.

Juan Buenaventura Thierry du Mont was after the war awarded the title of Viceroy of Navarre in 1749. Some 4 years later he died there, in Pamplona, 1753. He was much interested in paving adequately many roads used during many centuries taking particular care on any Roman remains in or around such roads. His tomb was moved several times, specially during the Napoleonic Wars to avoid desecration by the French Imperial soldiers. After two or more moves, his mausoleum was placed in the cloister of the Pamplona Cathedral, where it can be seen today.

Some references
http://www.diariodenavarra.es/decimoaniversario/noticias/20051030/semana/tumbas-historia.html?id=20051030&dia=20051030&ht=20051030/semana/tumbas-historia
https://web.archive.org/web/20171010015723/http://www.asasve.es/portal/index.php?mod=article&cat=articulos&article=63.
http://www.uned.es/ca-tudela/revista2/REVISTA5/n003/ana_mendiorozindex.htm. This is an IT access to the article:
EL CONDE DE GAGES, VIRREY DE NAVARRA DURANTE 1749-1753 by Ana Mendioroz Lacambra, published in Cuadernos del Marqués de San Adrián", reported as under the address:

http://www.uned.es/ca-tudela/.../ana_mendiorozindex.htm  
http://www.oronoz.com/paginas/muestrafotostitulos.php?pedido=NAVARRA%20PAMPLONA%20CATEDRAL-INTERIOR&tabla=Claves
Some 80 color photographs, probably copyrighted for no educational purposes, as they can be purchased, of Gothic style Pamplona Cathedral. The gotic tombstones of many Navarrese kings and their wives are fabulous.

Los Ingenieros militares en España, siglo XVIII: repertorio biográfico e inventario de su labor científica y espacial by Horacio Capel Sáez et al., Edic. Univ. Barcelona, 483 pages, (1983). 
 Los ingenieros militares de la Monarquía Hispánica en los siglos XVII y XVIII. Coord. by Alicia Cámara, Ministerio de Defensa, Madrid, (2005), some 381 pages.

1682 births
1753 deaths
Spanish generals
French military personnel of the War of the Austrian Succession
Spanish military personnel of the War of the Austrian Succession
People from Mons
Viceroys of Navarre
Knights of the Golden Fleece of Spain